Khasavyurtovsky District (Xasavürt yaq; , Xasi-Evlan khioşt) is an administrative and municipal district (raion), one of the forty-one in the Republic of Dagestan, Russia. It is located in the west of the republic. Its administrative center is the city of Khasavyurt (which is not administratively a part of the district). As of the 2010 Census, the total population of the district was 141,232.

Administrative and municipal status
Within the framework of administrative divisions, Khasavyurtovsky District is one of the forty-one in the republic. It is divided into thirteen selsoviets, comprising fifty-eight rural localities. The city of Khasavyurt serves as its administrative center, despite being incorporated separately as an administrative unit with the status equal to that of the districts.

As a municipal division, the district is incorporated as Khasavyurtovsky Municipal District. Its thirteen selsoviets are incorporated as forty-two rural settlements within the municipal district. The City of Khasavyurt is incorporated separately from the district as Khasavyurt Urban Okrug, but serves as the administrative center of the municipal district as well.

Demographics
As of the 2010 Census, the main ethnic groups are:
Avars: 31.4%
Kumyks: 30.7%
Chechens: 25.8%
Dargins: 5.4%
Lezgians: 5.3%
Laks: 0.2%
Russians: 0.2%

References

Notes

Sources

Districts of Dagestan